Arun Govil (born 12 January 1958) is an Indian actor who works in Hindi films and television. He is best known for portraying the role of Lord Rama in Ramanand Sagar's epic Television Series Ramayan and King Vikramāditya in  Vikram Aur Betaal.  He also appeared in films like Paheli (1977), Sawan Ko Aane Do (1979), Saanch Ko Aanch Nahin (1979), Jiyo To Aise Jiyo (1981), Himmatwala (1983) and Dilwaala (1986).

Early life
Arun Govil was born on 12 January 1958 in Meerut, Uttar Pradesh. He got his formal education at Chaudhary Charan Singh University, Meerut, Uttar Pradesh, where he studied engineering science and acted in some plays. He spent his teenage life in Shahjahanpur, Uttar Pradesh. His father wanted him to become a government servant while Arun wanted to do something for which he would be remembered.
.

Arun's father, Shri Chandra Prakash Govil, was a government officer. Arun is the fourth of six brothers and two sisters. His elder brother Vijay Govil is married to Tabassum, a former child actress and the host of the first Bollywood Celebrity talk show on Doordarshan  Phool Khile Hain Gulshan Gulshan, which continued for 21 years.

Career
In 1975, He moved to Mumbai to join his brother's business there. After a short while, he found that he no longer enjoyed the work and decided to find something more enjoyable. After doing dramas in college he decided to start acting. Govil got his first break in Indian cinema in the 1977 film Paheli, when he was introduced to Tarachand Barjatya by his sister-in-law Tabassum.
He made his Bollywood debut in  Prashanta Nanda's Paheli (1977). He shot to stardom after he was cast in Kanak Mishra's Sawan Ko Aane Do (1979) and Satyen Bose's Saanch Ko Aanch Nahin (1979). He made his small screen debut in Ramanand Sagar's Vikram Aur Betaal (1985). He was then cast as Lord Rama in Sagar's  TV series Ramayan (1986), for which he won the Uptron Award in the Best Actor in a Leading Role category in 1988. He reprised his role as Rama in Sagar's Luv Kush and Padmalya Telefilms Limited's Jai Veer Hanuman
Barjatya was really impressed by Govil's performance in the film and he signed him a three-film-deal — Kanak Mishra's Sawan Ko Aane Do (1979), Vijay Kapoor's Raadha Aur Seeta (1979) and Satyen Bose's Saanch Ko Aanch Nahin (1979). Sawan Ko Aane Do became a major success at box office catapulting Govil to stardom. Raadha Aur Seeta was a box office failure while Saanch Ko Aanch Nahin was another success at box office. He featured in Kanak Mishra's Jiyo To Aise Jiyo (1981).

Ramanand Sagar cast Govil as Vikramaditya in his television series Vikram Aur Betaal and Rama in Ramayan.

His role as Rama provided him great exposure and led him to be cast in other roles such as Harishchandra in the TV series Vishwamitra or Buddha in the TV series Buddha. He lent his voice as Rama in Yugo Sako's Indo-Japanese animation film Ramayana: The Legend of Prince Rama (1992). He also played the role of Laxman in V. Madhusudhana Rao's Lav Kush (1997). In the year 2020, he appeared on The Kapil Sharma Show as a guest along with Dipika Chikhlia , Sunil Lahri and Prem Sagar to promote book on Late Ramanand Sagar.

Personal life
Govil is married to actress Shrilekha. They have two children together, Sonika and Amal.

On March 18, 2021, he joined the Bhartiya Janata Party.

Filmography

Film

Television

References

External links

Arun Govil Official Website
Arun Govil On Instagram
Arun Govil On Facebook
Arun Govil On Youtube
Arun Govil On Koo App

Indian male film actors
Male actors in Bengali cinema
Indian male television actors
Living people
1948 births
People from Meerut
Chaudhary Charan Singh University alumni
People from Uttar Pradesh
Male actors in Hindi cinema
21st-century Indian male actors